Wellington Parker Burtnett, Jr. (August 26, 1930 – August 21, 2013) was an ice hockey player who played for the American national team. He won a silver medal at the 1956 Winter Olympics.

He died at his home in Wilmington, Massachusetts in 2013.

Awards and honors

References

External links

1930 births
2013 deaths
American men's ice hockey forwards
Ice hockey players at the 1956 Winter Olympics
Medalists at the 1956 Winter Olympics
Olympic silver medalists for the United States in ice hockey
Sportspeople from Somerville, Massachusetts
Ice hockey players from Massachusetts
Boston College Eagles men's ice hockey players
AHCA Division I men's ice hockey All-Americans